Sergio Nicolás Bubas, known as Nicolás Bubas (born 23 April 1989) is an Argentine footballer who plays as a forward for Italian  club Cavese. He also holds Italian citizenship.

Career
In October 2020, he joined Juve Stabia. On 3 January 2021, he was loaned to Cavese.

On 11 August 2021, he signed with Fidelis Andria.

On 25 August 2022, Bubas returned to Cavese, now in Serie D.

Career statistics

References

External links 
 Profile at BDFA 

1989 births
Living people
People from Esquel
Argentine footballers
Association football forwards
Primera Nacional players
Torneo Federal A players
Comisión de Actividades Infantiles footballers
Racing de Córdoba footballers
Bolivian Primera División players
Club Real Potosí players
Nacional Potosí players
Venezuelan Primera División players
Metropolitanos FC players
Chilean Primera División players
San Marcos de Arica footballers
Serie C players
Serie D players
U.S. Vibonese Calcio players
S.S. Juve Stabia players
Cavese 1919 players
S.S. Fidelis Andria 1928 players
Argentine expatriate footballers
Expatriate footballers in Bolivia
Expatriate footballers in Venezuela
Expatriate footballers in Chile
Expatriate footballers in Italy
Argentine expatriate sportspeople in Bolivia
Argentine expatriate sportspeople in Venezuela
Argentine expatriate sportspeople in Chile
Argentine expatriate sportspeople in Italy